Woodwark is a surname. Notable people with this surname include:

 Arthur Stanley Woodwark (1875-1945), British physician
 George Millington Woodwark (1923–2012), British cardiologist
 Graham Woodwark (1874–1938), English Liberal politician